"Bright Lights" is a song by American alternative rock group Matchbox Twenty. The song was released on July 28, 2003, as the third single from their third album, More Than You Think You Are (2002). "Bright Lights" peaked at number 23 on the US Billboard Hot 100 and reached the top 50 in Australia and New Zealand.

Content
The song is written by lead singer Rob Thomas, and is about a girl who leaves her hometown to pursue an unspecified career of some fame, possibly Broadway. Throughout the song, he pleads with the girl to let her know that she is encouraged to return home if things don't work out. According to Thomas, "Bright Lights" may be his favorite song he has recorded.

Music video
The video is taken directly from footage released on the DVD Show: A Night in the Life of Matchbox Twenty, and as such, is a live performance. As he also does in the studio version of the song, Rob Thomas plays the piano, and towards the end, Kyle Cook jumps atop the piano.

Track listing
 UK and Australian CD single
 "Bright Lights"
 "Disease" (live)
 "Bright Lights" (live)

Charts

Weekly charts

Year-end charts

Release history

References

2002 songs
2003 singles
Atlantic Records singles
Matchbox Twenty songs
Song recordings produced by Matt Serletic
Songs written by Rob Thomas (musician)